Max Rudolf Keydell (30 March 1887 – 21 May 1982) was a German classical philologist and librarian.

References 

 Hans-Georg Beck, Athanasios Kambylis, Paul Moraux (Hrsg.): Kyklos. Griechisches und Byzantinisches. Rudolf Keydell zum neunzigsten Geburtstag. Berlin/New York 1978 (mit Bild, Schriftenverzeichnis und Kurzbiografie).
 Bernd Schneider, Wolfhart Unte: Bibliographie Rudolf Keydell. Berlin 1973.

Corresponding Fellows of the British Academy
1887 births
1982 deaths